Pressnell is a surname. Notable people with the surname include:

Leslie Pressnell (1922–2011), British monetary historian
Tot Pressnell (1906–2001), American baseball player

See also
Presnell